Hemipenthes webberi is a species of bee flies in the family Bombyliidae.

Description
H. webberi measures 6–10 mm in length. They have a dark coloured abdomen, thorax, and head, with yellowish flecks on the head and thorax. A few white hairs are present at the edges of the thorax. The antennae are black. The legs are black, except at the tibiae, which are yellow.

Holotype
The holotype, named as Villa webberi by Johnson, 1919, is a male found at Massachusetts. It is in the Museum of Comparative Zoology.

Biology and lifecycle
Known larval hosts for Hemipenthes  include both Lepidoptera and diprionid sawflies and the tachinid flies and ichneumonoid wasps parasitizing them. Adults fly in June and July.

References

Further reading
Psyche, 1919, Vol. 26 by Johnson, pp. 11–12.
Canadian Journal of Arthropod Identification, 2008, #6 Bee Flies by Kits, et al., pg. 12.
Zootaxa, 2009 #2074 by Hernandez, pp. 42–43.

Bombyliidae
Articles created by Qbugbot
Insects described in 1919